Dave Plump (born December 13, 1942) is a former American football defensive back. He played for the San Diego Chargers in 1966 and for the BC Lions in 1967.

References

1942 births
Living people
American football defensive backs
Fresno State Bulldogs football players
San Diego Chargers players
BC Lions players